Ksenia Sergeyevna Gaydarzhi (born 8 February 1995 in Moscow) is a Russian tennis player.

Gaydarzhi has won two singles titles on the ITF tour in her career. On 21 September 2015, she reached her best singles ranking of world number 483. On 16 November 2015, she peaked at world number 796 in the doubles rankings.

Gaydarzhi made her WTA tour main draw debut at the 2014 Baku Cup. Having been awarded a wild card, she played Serbian qualifier Vesna Dolonc in the first round, losing in straight sets.

ITF finals (2–3)

Singles (2–1)

Doubles (0–2)

References

External links 
 
 

1995 births
Living people
Tennis players from Moscow
Russian female tennis players
21st-century Russian women
20th-century Russian women